The Scottish National Party (SNP;) is a Scottish nationalist and social democratic political party in Scotland. The SNP supports and campaigns for Scottish independence or secession from the United Kingdom and for Scotland's membership of the European Union, with a platform based on civic nationalism. The SNP is the largest political party in Scotland, where it has the most seats in the Scottish Parliament and 45 out of the 59 Scottish seats in the House of Commons at Westminster, and it is the third-largest political party by membership in the United Kingdom, behind the Labour Party  and the Conservative Party. The current Scottish National Party leader, Nicola Sturgeon, has served as First Minister of Scotland since 20 November 2014, though she announced her forthcoming resignation from these roles in a press conference on 15 February 2023.

Founded in 1934 with the amalgamation of the National Party of Scotland and the Scottish Party, the party has had continuous parliamentary representation in Westminster since Winnie Ewing won the 1967 Hamilton by-election. With the establishment of the devolved Scottish Parliament in 1999, the SNP became the second-largest party, serving two terms as the opposition. The SNP gained power under Alex Salmond at the 2007 Scottish Parliament election, forming a minority government, before going on to win the 2011 Parliament election, after which it formed Holyrood's first majority government. After Scotland voted against independence in the 2014 referendum, Salmond resigned and was succeeded by Sturgeon. The SNP was reduced back to being a minority government at the 2016 election. In the 2021 election, the SNP gained one seat and entered a power-sharing agreement with the Scottish Greens.

The SNP is the largest political party in Scotland in terms of both seats in the Westminster and Holyrood parliaments, and membership. As of 15 February 2023, the party had 72,186 members. It currently has 45 Members of Parliament (MPs), 64 Members of the Scottish Parliament (MSPs) and over 450 local councillors. The SNP is a member of the European Free Alliance (EFA). The party does not have any members of the House of Lords, on the principle that it opposes the upper house of Parliament and calls for it to be scrapped.

History

Foundation and early breakthroughs (1934–1970)

The SNP was formed in 1934 through the merger of the National Party of Scotland and the Scottish Party, with the Duke of Montrose and Cunninghame Graham as its first, joint, presidents. Sir Alexander MacEwen was its first chairman.

The party was divided on its approach to the Second World War. Professor Douglas Young, who was SNP leader from 1942 to 1945, campaigned for the Scottish people to refuse conscription and his activities were popularly vilified as undermining the British war effort against the Axis powers. Young was imprisoned for refusing to be conscripted. However, others in the party were explicitly pro-Nazi. Hugh MacDiarmid, who stood as an SNP candidate in 1945, believed that the Nazis were "less dangerous than our own government" and wrote a poem about the London Blitz that included the line "I hardly care". Arthur Donaldson, who went on to lead the party between 1961 and 1969, believed a Nazi invasion would benefit Scotland:

"The government would leave the country and England's position would be absolutely hopeless, as poverty and famine would be their only reward for declaring war on Germany. Scotland, on the other hand, had great possibilities."

The party suffered its first split during this period with John MacCormick leaving the party in 1942, owing to his failure to change the party's policy from supporting all-out independence to Home Rule at that year's conference in Glasgow. McCormick went on to form the Scottish Covenant Association, a non-partisan political organisation campaigning for the establishment of a devolved Scottish Assembly.

However, wartime conditions also enabled the SNP's first parliamentary success at the Motherwell by-election in 1945, but Robert McIntyre MP lost the seat at the general election three months later. The 1950s were characterised by similarly low levels of support, and this made it difficult for the party to advance. Indeed, in most general elections they were unable to put up more than a handful of candidates.

The 1960s, however, offered more electoral successes, with candidates polling credibly at Glasgow Bridgeton in 1961, West Lothian in 1962 and Glasgow Pollok in 1967. Indeed, this foreshadowed Winnie Ewing's surprise victory in a by-election at the previously safe Labour seat of Hamilton. This brought the SNP to national prominence, leading to the establishment of the Kilbrandon Commission.

Becoming a notable force (1970s) 

Despite this breakthrough, the 1970 general election was to prove a disappointment for the party as, despite an increase in vote share, Ewing failed to retain her seat in Hamilton. The party did receive some consolation with the capture of the Western Isles, making Donald Stewart the party's only MP. This was to be the case until the 1973 by-election at Glasgow Govan where a hitherto safe Labour seat was claimed by Margo MacDonald.

1974 was to prove something of an annus mirabilis for the party as it deployed its highly effective It's Scotland's oil campaign. The SNP gained 6 seats at the February general election before hitting a high point in the October re-run, polling almost a third of all votes in Scotland and returning 11 MPs to Westminster. Furthermore, during that year's local elections the party claimed overall control of Cumbernauld and Kilsyth.

This success was to continue for much of the decade, and at the 1977 district elections the SNP saw victories at councils including East Kilbride and Falkirk and held the balance of power in Glasgow. However, this level of support was not to last and by 1978 Labour revival was evident at three by-elections (Glasgow Garscadden, Hamilton and Berwick and East Lothian) as well as the regional elections.

This was to culminate when the party experienced a large drop in its support at the 1979 general election, precipitated by the party bringing down the incumbent Labour minority government following the controversial failure of that year's devolution referendum. Reduced to just 2 MPs, the successes of October 1974 were not to be surpassed until the 2015 general election.

In 1979 the party's MPs supported Margaret Thatcher's Motion of No Confidence in James Callaghan's Labour Government, with the motion carried by 311 votes to 310. Callaghan taunted the party that they were like "the turkeys who voted for Christmas" and the party went on to lose all but two of its seats in the subsequent election that ushered in 18 years of Tory rule.

Factional divisions and infighting (1980s) 

Following this defeat, a period of internal strife occurred within the party, culminating with the formation of two internal groups: the ultranationalist Siol nan Gaidheal and left-wing 79 Group. Traditionalists within the party, centred around Winnie Ewing, by this time an MEP, responded by establishing the Campaign for Nationalism in Scotland which sought to ensure that the primary objective of the SNP was campaigning for independence without a traditional left-right orientation, even though this would have undone the work of figures such as William Wolfe, who developed a clearly social democratic policy platform throughout the 1970s.

These events ensured the success of a leadership motion at the party's annual conference of 1982, in Ayr, despite the 79 Group being bolstered by the merger of Jim Sillars' Scottish Labour Party (SLP) although this influx of ex-SLP members further shifted the characteristics of the party leftwards. Despite this, traditionalist figure Gordon Wilson remained party leader through the electoral disappointments of 1983 and 1987, where he lost his own Dundee East seat won 13 years prior.

Through this period, Sillars' influence in the party grew, developing a clear socio-economic platform including Independence in Europe, reversing the SNP's previous opposition to membership of the then-EEC which had been unsuccessful in a 1975 referendum. This position was enhanced further by Sillars reclaiming Glasgow Govan in a by-election in 1988.

Despite this moderation, the party did not join Labour, the Liberal Democrats and the Greens as well as civil society in the Scottish Constitutional Convention which developed a blueprint for a devolved Scottish Parliament due to the unwillingness of the convention to discuss independence as a constitutional option.

First Salmond era (1990s) 

Alex Salmond had been elected MP for Banff and Buchan in 1987, after the re-admittance of 79 Group members, and was able to seize the party leadership after Wilson's resignation in 1990 after a contest with Margaret Ewing. This was a surprise victory as Ewing had the backing of much of the party establishment, including Sillars and then-Party Secretary John Swinney. The defection of Labour MP Dick Douglas further evidenced the party's clear left-wing positioning, particularly regarding opposition to the poll tax. Despite this, Salmond's leadership was unable to avert a fourth successive general election disappointment in 1992 with the party reduced back from 5 to 3 MPs.

The mid-90s offered some successes for the party, with North East Scotland being gained at the 1994 European elections and the party securing a by-election at Perth and Kinross in 1995 after a near-miss at Monklands East the previous year.

1997 offered the party's most successful general election for 23 years, although in the face of the Labour landslide the party was unable to match either of the two 1974 elections. That September, the party joined with the members of the Scottish Constitutional Convention in the successful Yes-Yes campaign in the devolution referendum which lead to the establishment of a Scottish Parliament with tax-varying powers.

By 1999, the first elections to the parliament were being held, although the party suffered a disappointing result, gaining just 35 MSPs in the face of Salmond's unpopular 'Kosovo Broadcast' which opposed NATO intervention in the country.

Opposing Labour-Liberal Democrat coalitions (1999–2007) 
This meant that the party began as the official opposition in the parliament to a Labour-Liberal Democrat coalition government. Salmond found the move to a more consensual politics difficult and sought a return to Westminster, resigning the leadership in 2000 with John Swinney, like Salmond a gradualist, victorious in the ensuring leadership election. Swinney's leadership proved ineffectual, with a loss of one MP in 2001 and a further reduction to 27 MSPs in 2003 despite the Officegate scandal unseating previous First Minister Henry McLeish. However, the only parties to gain seats in that election were the Scottish Greens and the Scottish Socialist Party (SSP) which like the SNP support independence.

Following an unsuccessful leadership challenge in 2003, Swinney stepped down following disappointing results in the European elections of 2004 with Salmond victorious in the subsequent leadership contest despite initially refusing to be candidate. Nicola Sturgeon was elected Depute Leader and became the party's leader in the Scottish Parliament until Salmond was able to return at the next parliamentary election.

Salmond governments (2007–2014)

In 2007, the SNP emerged as the largest party in the Scottish Parliament with 47 of 129 seats, narrowly ousting Scottish Labour with 46 seats and Alex Salmond becoming First Minister after ousting the Liberal Democrats in Gordon. The Scottish Greens supported Salmond's election as First Minister, and his subsequent appointments of ministers, in return for early tabling of the climate change bill and the SNP nominating a Green MSP to chair a parliamentary committee. Despite this, Salmond's minority government tended to strike budget deals with the Conservatives to stay in office.

In May 2011, the SNP won an overall majority in the Scottish Parliament with 69 seats. This was a significant feat as the Additional member system used for Scottish Parliament elections was specifically designed to prevent one party from winning an outright majority. This was followed by a reverse in the party's previous opposition to NATO membership at the party's annual conference in 2012 despite Salmond's refusal to apologise for the Kosovo broadcast on the occasion of the Kosovo Declaration of Independence.

This majority enabled the SNP government to hold a referendum on Scottish independence in 2014. The "No" vote prevailed in a close-fought campaign, prompting the resignation of First Minister Alex Salmond. Forty-five percent of Scottish voters cast their ballots for independence, with the "Yes" side receiving less support than late polling predicted. Exit polling by Lord Ashcroft suggested that many No voters thought independence too risky, while others voted for the Union because of their emotional attachment to Britain. Older voters, women and middle class voters voted no in margins above the national average.

Following the Yes campaign's defeat, Salmond resigned and Nicola Sturgeon won that year's leadership election unopposed.

Sturgeon years (2014–present) 

The SNP rebounded from their loss at the independence referendum at the 2015 UK general election eight months later, led by former Depute Leader Nicola Sturgeon. The party went from holding six seats in the House of Commons to 56, ending 51 years of dominance by the Scottish Labour Party. All but three of the fifty-nine constituencies in the country elected an SNP candidate in the party's most comprehensive electoral victory at any level.

At the 2016 Scottish election, the SNP lost a net total of 6 seats, losing its overall majority in the Scottish Parliament, but returning for a third consecutive term as a minority government despite gaining an additional 1.1% of the constituency vote, for the party's best-ever result, from the 2011 election however 2.3% of the regional list vote. On the constituency vote, the SNP gained 11 seats from Labour, but lost the Edinburgh Southern constituency to Labour. The Conservatives and Liberal Democrats each gained two constituency seats from the SNP on 2011 (Aberdeenshire West and Edinburgh Central for the Conservatives and Edinburgh Western and North East Fife for the Liberal Democrats).

This election was followed by the 2016 European Union referendum after which the SNP joined with the Liberal Democrats and Greens to call for continued UK membership of the EU. Despite a consequential increase in the Conservative Party vote at the 2017 local elections the SNP for the first time became the largest party in each of Scotland's four city councils: Aberdeen, Dundee, Edinburgh and Glasgow, where a Labour administration was ousted after 37 years.

At the 2017 UK general election, the SNP underperformed compared to polling expectations, losing 21 seats to bring their number of Commons seats down to 35 – however this was still the party's second-best result ever at the time. This was largely attributed by many, including former Deputy First Minister John Swinney, to their stance on holding a second Scottish independence referendum and saw a swing to the unionist parties, with seats being picked up by the Conservatives, Labour and the Liberal Democrats and a reduction in their majorities in the other seats. Stephen Gethins, MP for North East Fife, came out of this election with a majority of just two votes to the Liberal Democrat candidate. High-profile losses included SNP Commons leader: Angus Robertson in Moray and former SNP leader and First Minister Alex Salmond in Gordon.

The SNP went on to achieve its best-ever European Parliament result in the final election before Brexit, the party taking its MEP total to 3 or half of Scottish seats and achieving a record vote share for the party. This was also the best performance of any party in the era of proportional elections to the European Parliament in Scotland. This was suggested as being due to the party's europhile sentiment during what amounted to a single-issue election, with parties that lacked a clear message performing poorly, such as Labour finishing in fifth place and losing all of their Scottish MEPs for the first time.

Later that year, the SNP experienced a surge in support at the 2019 general election, winning a 45.0% share of the vote and 48 seats, its second-best result ever. Although the party lost its most marginal seat to Wendy Chamberlain of the Liberal Democrats, it gained the seat of then Liberal Democrat leader Jo Swinson, along with 7 from the Conservatives and 6 from Labour. Swinson's loss triggered a leadership contest in the Liberal Democrats as a result. This victory was generally attributed to Sturgeon's cautious approach regarding holding a second independence referendum and a strong emphasis on retaining EU membership during the election campaign. The following January, the strengthened Conservative government ensured that the UK left the European Union on 31 January 2020.

At the 2021 Scottish election, the SNP won 64 seats, one seat short of a majority, albeit achieving a record high number of votes, vote share and constituency seats, and leading to another minority government led by the SNP. Sturgeon emphasised after her party's victory that it would focus on controlling the COVID-19 pandemic as well as pushing for a second referendum on independence.

Although in 2021 they won with a minority, a majority of MSPs elected had come from parties that supported Scottish independence, this prompted negotiations started between the SNP and the Scottish Green Party to secure some form of deal that would see Green ministers appointed to government and the Scottish Greens backing SNP policies, with hopes that this united front on independence would solidify the SNP's mandate for the second independence referendum. The Alba Party, led by former First Minister and SNP leader Alex Salmond, did not achieve an electoral breakthrough at Holyrood as expected, however they intended to cooperate to create a "super majority" for Scottish independence if elected. The Third Sturgeon government was formed with Green support.

In the 2022 Scottish local elections, the SNP remained as the biggest party, winning a record number of councillors and securing majority control of Dundee.

On 15 February 2023, Sturgeon announced her intention to resign as leader and first minister of Scotland, which will mark the end of over eight years in office.

Post Sturgeon era (2023 onwards) 
A new leader is set to be announced on 27 March 2023. The current candidates running in the ongoing SNP election are; Kate Forbes, Ash Regan, and Humza Yousaf. The leadership election has been dominated by the strategy for a second independence referendum and the Gender Recognition Reform Bill, which has divided the party. Yousaf is seen as a continuity candidate to Sturgeon's policies and his views align with the party establishment, while Forbes and Regan are seen to be part of a new generational shift in the party.

On 16 March 2023, it was revealed that the SNP’s membership had fallen to 72,000, down from over 125,000 at the end of 2019. As a result of this, CEO Peter Murrell resigned on 18 March after criticism was levied at him over the way the figures were published. He has been replaced in an acting capacity by party president Michael Russell.

Constitution and structure
The local Branches are the primary level of organisation in the SNP. All of the Branches within each Scottish Parliament constituency form a Constituency Association, which coordinates the work of the Branches within the constituency, coordinates the activities of the party in the constituency and acts as a point of liaison between an MSP or MP and the party. Constituency Associations are composed of delegates from all of the Branches within the constituency.

The annual National Conference is the supreme governing body of the SNP and is responsible for determining party policy and electing the National Executive Committee. The National Conference is composed of:
 delegates from every Branch and Constituency Association
 the members of the National Executive Committee
 every SNP MSP and MP
 all SNP councillors
 delegates from each of the SNP's Affiliated Organisations (Young Scots for Independence, SNP Students, SNP Trade Union Group, the Association of Nationalist Councillors, the Disabled Members Group, the SNP BAME Network, Scots Asians for Independence, and Out for Independence)

There are also regular meetings of the National Assembly, which provides a forum for detailed discussions of party policy by party members.

Membership
The SNP experienced a large surge in membership following the 2014 Scottish independence referendum. In 2013 the party's membership stood at just 20,000, but that number had swelled to over 100,000 by 2015. Annual accounts submitted by the party to the Electoral Commission showed the SNP to have over 119,000 members in 2021. By the end of 2021, the party reported that it had 103,884 members. Membership then continued to fall: to 85,000 at the end of 2022 [citation needed], and to 72,186 in March 2023.

European affiliation
The SNP retains close links with Plaid Cymru, its counterpart in Wales. MPs from both parties co-operate closely with each other and work as a single parliamentary group within the House of Commons. Both the SNP and Plaid Cymru are members of the European Free Alliance (EFA), a European political party comprising regionalist political parties. The EFA co-operates with the larger European Green Party to form The Greens–European Free Alliance (Greens/EFA) group in the European Parliament. Before its affiliation with The Greens–European Free Alliance, the SNP had previously been allied with the European Progressive Democrats (1979–1984), Rainbow Group (1989–1994) and European Radical Alliance (1994–1999).

As the UK is no longer a member of the EU, the SNP has no MEPs. In the 2019 European Parliament election, the SNP won 3 out of 6 seats in Scotland.

Policies

Ideology
The Scottish National Party did not have a clear ideological position until the 1970s, when it sought to explicitly present itself as a social democratic party in terms of party policy and publicity. During the period from its foundation until the 1960s, the SNP was essentially a moderate centrist party. Debate within the party focused more on the SNP being distinct as an all-Scotland national movement, with it being neither of the left nor the right, but constituting a new politics that sought to put Scotland first.

The SNP was formed through the merger of the centre-left National Party of Scotland (NPS) and the centre-right Scottish Party. The SNP's founders were united over self-determination in principle, though not its exact nature, or the best strategic means to achieve self-government. From the mid-1940s onwards, SNP policy was radical and redistributionist concerning land and in favour of 'the diffusion of economic power', including the decentralisation of industries such as coal to include the involvement of local authorities and regional planning bodies to control industrial structure and development. Party policies supported the economic and social policy status quo of the post-war welfare state.

By the 1960s, the SNP was starting to become defined ideologically, with a social democratic tradition emerging as the party grew in urban, industrial Scotland, and its membership experienced an influx of social democrats from the Labour Party, the trade unions and the Campaign for Nuclear Disarmament. The emergence of Billy Wolfe as a leading figure in the SNP also contributed to the leftwards shift. By this period, the Labour Party was also the dominant party in Scotland, in terms of electoral support and representation. Targeting Labour through emphasising left-of-centre policies and values was therefore electorally logical for the SNP, as well as tying in with the ideological preferences of many new party members. In 1961, the SNP conference expressed the party's opposition to the siting of the US Polaris submarine base at the Holy Loch. This policy was followed in 1963 by a motion opposed to nuclear weapons: a policy that has remained in place ever since. The 1964 policy document, SNP & You, contained a clear centre-left policy platform, including commitments to full employment, government intervention in fuel, power and transport, a state bank to guide economic development, encouragement of cooperatives and credit unions, extensive building of council houses (social housing) by central and local government, pensions adjusted to cost of living, a minimum wage and an improved national health service.

The 1960s also saw the beginnings of the SNP's efforts to establish an industrial organisation and mobilise amongst trade unionists in Scotland, with the establishment of the SNP Trade Union Group, and identifying the SNP with industrial campaigns, such as the Upper-Clyde Shipbuilders Work-in and the attempt of the workers at the Scottish Daily Express to run as a co-operative. For the party manifestos for the two 1974 general elections, the SNP finally self-identified as a social democratic party, and proposed a range of social democratic policies. There was also an unsuccessful proposal at the 1975 party conference to rename the party as the Scottish National Party (Social Democrats). In the UK-wide referendum on Britain's membership of the European Economic Community (EEC) in the same year as the aforementioned attempted name change, the SNP campaigned for Britain to leave the EEC.

There were further ideological and internal struggles after 1979, with the 79 Group attempting to move the SNP further to the left, away from being what could be described a "social-democratic" party, to an expressly "socialist" party. Members of the 79 Group – including future party leader and First Minister Alex Salmond – were expelled from the party. This produced a response in the shape of the Campaign for Nationalism in Scotland from those who wanted the SNP to remain a "broad church", apart from arguments of left vs. right. The 1980s saw the SNP further define itself as a party of the political left, such as campaigning against the introduction of the poll tax in Scotland in 1989; one year before the tax was imposed on the rest of the UK.

Ideological tensions inside the SNP are further complicated by arguments between the so-called SNP gradualists and SNP fundamentalists. In essence, gradualists seek to advance Scotland to independence through further devolution, in a "step-by-step" strategy. They tend to be in the moderate left grouping, though much of the 79 Group was gradualist in approach. However, this 79 Group gradualism was as much a reaction against the fundamentalists of the day, many of whom believed the SNP should not take a clear left or right position.

Economy 
During the 1970s the SNP campaigned widely on the political slogan It's Scotland's oil, where it was argued that the discovery of North Sea oil off the coast of Scotland, and the revenue that it created would not benefit Scotland to any significant degree while Scotland remained part of the United Kingdom. 

The Sturgeon Government in 2017 adjusted income tax rates so that low earners would pay less and those earning more than £33,000 a year would pay more. Previously the party had replaced the flat rate Stamp Duty with the LBTT, which uses a graduated tax rate. Whilst in government, the party was also responsible for the establishment of Revenue Scotland to administer devolved taxation.

Having previously defined itself in opposition to the poll tax the SNP has also championed progressive taxation at a local level. Despite pledging to introduce a local income tax the Salmond Government found itself unable to replace the council tax and the party has, particularly since the ending of the council tax freeze under Nicola Sturgeon's leadership, committing to increasing the graduated nature of the tax. Conversely, the party has also supported capping and reducing Business Rates in an attempt to support small businesses.

It has been noted that the party contains a broader spectrum of opinion regarding economic policy than most political parties in the UK due to its status as "the only viable vehicle for Scottish independence", with the party's parliamentary group at Westminster in 2016 including socialists such as Tommy Sheppard and Mhairi Black, capitalists such as Stewart Hosie and former Conservative, Tasmina Ahmed-Sheikh.

Social justice 
When Robin Cook MP moved an amendment to legalise homosexual acts to the Bill which became the Criminal Justice (Scotland) Act 1980, he stated "The clause bears the names of hon. Members from all three major parties. I regret that the only party represented among Scottish Members of Parliament from which there has been no support for the clause is the Scottish National Party. I am pleased to see both representatives of that party in their place, and I hope to convert them in the remainder of my remarks." When the amendment came to a vote, the SNP's MPs Gordon Wilson and Donald Stewart both voted against the decriminalisation of homosexual acts.

Under Sturgeon's leadership, Scotland was twice in succession named the best country in Europe for LGBT+ legal equality. The party is considered very supportive of gays, lesbians and bisexuals - something that historically was not the case, as stated above.

Party policy aims to introduce gender self-identification to allow an easier process of gender recognition for transgender community. However, the policy is highly controversial within the SNP and many of the party's social conservatives have expressed concerns that the reforms would be open to abuse and allow predatory men into women's spaces. The Scottish Government paused the legislation in order to find "maximum consensus" on the issue and commentators described the issue as having divided the SNP like no other, with many dubbing the debate a "civil war". In January 2021 a former trans officer in the SNP's LGBT wing, Teddy Hopes, quit the party, describing it was one of the "core hubs of transphobia in Scotland". Large numbers of LGBT activists followed suit and Sturgeon released a video message in which she said that transphobia is "not acceptable" and that she hoped they would one day rejoin the party.

Particularly since Nicola Sturgeon's elevation to First Minister the party has highlighted its commitments to gender equality – with her first act being to appoint a gender balanced cabinet. The SNP have also taken steps to implement all-women shortlists whilst Sturgeon has introduced a mentoring scheme to encourage women's political engagement.

The SNP supports multiculturalism with Scotland receiving thousands of refugees from the Syrian Civil War. To this end it has been claimed that refugees in Scotland are better supported than those in England. More generally, the SNP seeks to increase immigration to combat a declining population and calling for a separate Scottish visa even within the UK.

Foreign affairs and defence 

Despite traditionally supporting military neutrality the SNP's policy has in recent years moved to support both the Atlanticist and Europeanist traditions. This is particularly evident in the conclusion of the NATO debate within the party in favour of those who support membership of the military alliance. This is despite the party's continuing opposition to Scotland hosting nuclear weapons and then-leader Salmond's criticism of both the Kosovo intervention and the Iraq War. The party has placed an emphasis on developing positive relations with the United States in recent years despite a lukewarm reaction to the election of part-Scottish American Donald Trump as President due to long running legal disputes.

Having opposed continued membership in the 1975 referendum, the party has supported membership of the European Union since the adoption of the Independence in Europe policy during the 1980s. Consequentially, the SNP supported remaining within the EU during the 2016 referendum where every Scottish council area backed this position. Consequently, the party opposed Brexit and sought a further referendum on the withdrawal agreement, ultimately unsuccessfully. The SNP would like to see an independent Scotland as a member of the European Union and NATO and has left open the prospect of an independent Scotland joining the euro.

The SNP has also taken a stance against Russian interference abroad – the party supporting the enlargement of the EU and NATO to areas such as the Western Balkans and Ukraine to counter this influence. The party called for repercussions for Russia regarding the poisoning of Sergei and Yulia Skripal and has criticised former leader Alex Salmond for broadcasting a chat show on Kremlin-backed network RT. Consequently, party representatives have expressed support for movements such as Euromaidan that support the independence of countries across Eastern Europe.

The party have supported measures including foreign aid which seek to facilitate international development through various charitable organisations. In recognition of Scotland's historic links to the country, these programmes are mostly focused in Malawi in common with previous Scottish governments. With local authorities across the country, including Glasgow City Council being involved in this partnership since before the SNP took office in 2007.

Health and education 

The SNP have pledged to uphold the public service nature of NHS Scotland and are consequently opposed to any attempts at privatisation of the health service, including any inclusion in a post-Brexit trade deal with the United States. The party has been fond of increasing provision under the NHS with the introduction of universal baby boxes based on the Finnish scheme. This supported child development alongside other commitments including the expansion of free childcare for children younger than school age and the introduction of universal free school meals in the first three years of school.

Previously, SNP governments have abolished hospital parking charges as well as prescription charges in efforts to promote enhanced public health outcomes by increasing access to care and treatment. Furthermore, during Sturgeon's premiership, Scotland became the first country in the world to introduce alcohol minimum unit pricing to counter alcohol problems. Recently, the party has also committed to providing universal access to sanitary products and the liberalisation of drugs policy through devolution, in an effort to increase access to treatment and improve public health outcomes. Between 2014 and 2019 the party slashed the budget for drug and alcohol treatments by 6.3% - a cut that has been linked with Scotland recording the highest number of drug deaths per head in Europe.

The party aspires to promote universal access to education, with one of the first acts of the Salmond government being to abolish tuition fees - although it has also introduced a cap on the number of Scots who can attend university and cut funding for further education colleges. More recently, the party has turned its attention to widening access to higher education with Nicola Sturgeon stating that education is her number one priority. At school level, the Curriculum for Excellence is currently undergoing a review.

Constitution 

 
The foundations of the SNP are a belief that Scotland would be more prosperous by being governed independently from the United Kingdom, although the party was defeated in the 2014 referendum on this issue. The party has since sought to hold a second referendum at some point in the future, perhaps related to the outcome of Brexit, as the party sees a referendum as the only route to independence. In 2016 the party convened the Sustainable Growth Commission to advise on the economy and currency of an independent Scotland. Although the Sustainable Growth Commission's report, published in 2018, divides opinion it contains the party's official economic recommendations in the event of independence. The party is constitutionalist and as such rejects holding such a referendum unilaterally or any course of actions that could lead to comparisons with cases such as Catalonia with the party seeing independence as a process that should be undertaken through a consensual process alongside the UK Government. As part of this process towards independence, the party supports increased devolution to the Scottish Parliament and the Scottish Government, particularly in areas such as welfare and immigration.

Official SNP policy is supportive of the monarchy. Many party members are republicans but party leader, Nicola Sturgeon, believes it is a "model with many merits", although she has proposed reducing the funds spent on the royal family. Separately, the SNP has always opposed the UK's unelected upper house and would like to see both it and the House of Commons elected by a form of proportional representation. The party also supports the introduction of a codified constitution, either for an independent Scotland or the UK as a whole, going as far as producing a proposed interim constitution for Scotland during the independence referendum campaign.

Fundamentalists and gradualists 
There have always been divisions within the party on how to achieve Scottish independence, with one wing described as 'fundamentalists' and the other 'gradualists'. The SNP leadership generally subscribes to the gradualist viewpoint, that being the idea that independence can be won by the accumulation by the Scottish Parliament of powers that the UK Parliament currently has over time. Fundamentalism stands in opposition to the so-called gradualist point of view, which believes that the SNP should emphasise independence more widely to achieve it. The argument goes that if the SNP is unprepared to argue for its central policy then it is unlikely ever to persuade the public of its worthiness.

Leadership

Leader of the Scottish National Party

Depute Leader of the Scottish National Party

President of the Scottish National Party
 James Graham, 6th Duke of Montrose and Robert Bontine Cunninghame Graham (joint), 1934–1936 
 Roland Muirhead, 1936–1950
 Tom Gibson, 1950–1958
 Robert McIntyre, 1958–1980
 William Wolfe, 1980–1982
 Donald Stewart, 1982–1987
 Winnie Ewing, 1987–2005
 Ian Hudghton, 2005–2020
 Michael Russell, 2020–present

National Secretary of the Scottish National Party
 John MacCormick, 1934–1942
 Robert McIntyre, 1942–1947
 Mary Fraser Dott, 1947–1951
 Robert Curran, 1951–1954
 John Smart, 1954–1963
 Malcolm Shaw, 1963–1964
 Gordon Wilson, 1964–1971
 Muriel Gibson, 1971–1972
 Rosemary Hall, 1972–1975
 Muriel Gibson, 1975–1977
 Chrissie MacWhirter, 1977–1979
 Iain Murray, 1979–1981
 Neil MacCallum, 1981–1986
 John Swinney, 1986–1992
 Alasdair Morgan, 1992–1997
 Stewart Hosie, 1999–2003
 Alasdair Allan, 2003–2006
 Duncan Ross, 2006–2009
 William Henderson, 2009–2012
 Patrick Grady, 2012–2016
 Angus MacLeod, 2016–2020
 Stewart Stevenson, 2020–2021
 Lorna Finn, 2021-present

Leader of the parliamentary party, Scottish Parliament
 Alex Salmond (Banff and Buchan), 1999–2000 
 John Swinney (North Tayside), 2000–2004
 Alex Salmond (Aberdeenshire East), 2004–2014
 Nicola Sturgeon (Glasgow Southside) 2014–present

Leader of the parliamentary party, House of Commons
 Donald Stewart (Western Isles), 1974–1987
 Margaret Ewing (Moray), 1987–1999
 Alasdair Morgan (Galloway and Upper Nithsdale), 1999–2001
 Alex Salmond (Banff and Buchan), 2001–2007
 Angus Robertson (Moray), 2007–2017
 Ian Blackford (Ross, Skye and Lochaber), 2017–2022
 Stephen Flynn (Aberdeen South), 2022–present

Chief Executive Officer 

 Michael Russell, 1994–1999
 Peter Murrell, 1999–2023
 Michael Russell (acting), 2023-present

Current SNP Council Leaders 

 Clackmannanshire: Les Sharp (Clackmannanshire West), since 2017 
 Dundee City: John Alexander (Strathmartine), since 2017
 East Ayrshire: Douglas Reid (Kilmarnock West and Crosshouse), since 2007
 East Renfrewshire: Tony Buchanan (Newton Mearns North and Neilston), since 2017
 City of Edinburgh: Adam McVey (Leith), since 2017
 Falkirk: Cecil Meiklejohn (Falkirk North), since 2017
Fife: David Alexander (Leven, Kennoway and Largo), since 2017
 Glasgow City: Susan Aitken (Langside), since 2017
 Moray: Graham Leadbitter (Elgin South), since 2018
 Renfrewshire: Iain Nicolson (Erskine and Inchinnan), since 2017
 South Ayrshire: Douglas Campbell (Ayr North), since 2017
 South Lanarkshire: John Ross (Hamilton South), since 2017
 Stirling: Scott Farmer (Stirling West), since 2017
 West Dunbartonshire: Jonathon McColl (Lomond), since 2017

Scottish Parliament

Members of the Scottish Parliament 

The SNP has formed the Scottish Government since 2007. , the Cabinet of the Scottish Government is as follows:

Parliament of the United Kingdom

Members of Parliament 
The SNP hold a majority of Scottish seats in the House of Commons, and does not take seats in the House of Lords. As of December 2022, the SNP frontbench team in the House of Commons is as follows.

Local Government

Councillors
The SNP had 453 councillors in Local Government elected from the 2022 Scottish local elections.

Electoral performance

Scottish Parliament

House of Commons

Local councils

Results by council (2022)

European Parliament (1979–2020)

Two-tier local councils (1975–1996)

See also 

 Bo'ness Branch SNP
 Culture of Scotland
 Politics of Scotland
 History of Scottish devolution
 It's Scotland's oil
 Radio Free Scotland
 Scottish Campaign for Nuclear Disarmament
 The National (Scotland)

References

Further reading
 Brand, Jack, The National Movement in Scotland, Routledge and Kegan Paul, 1978
 Brand, Jack, 'Scotland', in Watson, Michael (ed.), Contemporary Minority Nationalism, Routledge, 1990
 Winnie Ewing, Michael Russell, Stop the World; The Autobiography of Winnie Ewing Birlinn, 2004
 Richard J. Finlay, Independent and Free: Scottish Politics and the Origins of the Scottish National Party 1918–1945, John Donald Publishers, 1994
 Hanham, H.J., Scottish Nationalism, Harvard University Press, 1969
 Christopher Harvie, Scotland and Nationalism: Scottish Society and Politics 1707 to the Present, Routledge (4th edition), 2004
 Gerry Hassan (ed.), The Modern SNP: From Protest to Power, Edinburgh University Press, 2009, 
 Lynch, Peter, SNP: The History of the Scottish National Party, Welsh Academic Press, 2002
 John MacCormick, The Flag in the Wind: The Story of the National Movement in Scotland, Victor Gollancz Ltd, 1955
 Mitchell, James, Strategies for Self-government: The Campaigns for a Scottish Parliament, Polygon, 1996
 Mitchell, James, Bennie, Lynn and Johns, Rob, The Scottish National Party: Transition to Power, Oxford University Press, 2011, 
 Mitchell, James and Hassan, Gerry (eds), Scottish National Party Leaders, Biteback, 2016. 
 Jim Sillars, Scotland: the Case for Optimism, Polygon, 1986
 William Wolfe, Scotland Lives: the Quest for Independence, Reprographia, 1973

External links
 Scottish National Party – Official website

 
1934 establishments in Scotland
Centre-left parties in the United Kingdom
Constitution of the United Kingdom
European Free Alliance
Nationalist parties in the United Kingdom
Organisations based in Edinburgh
Political parties established in 1934
Scottish independence
Social democratic parties
Social democratic parties in the United Kingdom